Norman Boswell "Hec" Fowler (October 14, 1892 – July 30, 1987) was a two-sport athlete from Canada. He was a professional ice hockey goaltender who played in the Pacific Coast Hockey Association and National Hockey League between 1916 and 1925. He was also a soccer goalkeeper for Saskatoon Thistle.

He was the last surviving former player of the Spokane Canaries.

Playing career
Fowler played for various senior league teams in his hometown of Saskatoon from 1909 to 1916, appearing in the Allan Cup playoffs in 1916, before turning professional with the Spokane Canaries of the PCHA in 1917. The Canaries, citing poor attendance, disbanded for the following season, and while Fowler had played poorly for Spokane, the defending Stanley Cup champion Seattle Metropolitans were confident enough to sign him as their goaltender. With Fowler at the helm, the Mets won the league championship but were upset in the playoffs by the Vancouver Millionaires.

At that point, Fowler enlisted in the military for the last year of World War I, and when he mustered out of the service, signed with the Victoria Cougars for the 1920 season. Most spectacularly, he turned aside three penalty shots in a match against the Millionaires on December 12, 1921. 

He played five seasons in all for the Cougars before being sold to the expansion Boston Bruins of the National Hockey League in October 1924. Behind a weak defense, Fowler was repeatedly shelled, and it was reported that he was displeased with the team's direction.  In his last game with Boston, he allowed nine goals in 49 minutes against the Toronto St. Patricks before leaving the ice on his own; he was replaced in net by left winger George Redding.  Fowler admitted to a Montreal Gazette reporter afterwards that he was deliberately letting in goals, so that the Bruins would be embarrassed enough by the loss to obtain better players.  As a result, he was suspended indefinitely by Boston, fined $200 and ultimately released. 

He signed with the Edmonton Eskimos of the Western Canada Hockey League to finish the season, but took the next year off. Fowler played one more season in Edmonton in 1927, then three for the Oakland Sheiks of the professional California Hockey League between 1928 and 1931 – leading the team to consecutive championships his last two seasons – before retiring.

Lacrosse 

As with many other players of the era, Fowler was a lacrosse player in the summers, serving as secretary of the Vancouver Lacrosse Club and acting as an umpire, referee and timekeeper in matches.

Career statistics

Regular season and playoffs

Awards and achievements
 PCHA First All-Star Team in 1917.
 PCHA Second All-Star Team in 1918.

References

External links

1892 births
1987 deaths
Boston Bruins players
Canadian ice hockey goaltenders
Canadian military personnel of World War I
Edmonton Eskimos (ice hockey) players
Ice hockey people from Saskatchewan
Seattle Metropolitans players
Spokane Canaries players
Sportspeople from Saskatoon
Victoria Aristocrats players
Victoria Cougars (1911–1926) players